The third season of the sports entertainment reality competition series Australian Ninja Warrior premiered on 8 July 2019 on the Nine Network. The season is hosted by Rebecca Maddern, Ben Fordham & Freddie Flintoff.

Format Changes

Prize Money - This season offered two separate prizes, unlike previous seasons. The furthest and fastest competitor through the four stages of the grand final received $100,000. This was Charlie Robbins, who, out of the five Grand Final contestants who made it to stage 3, reached the furthest obstacle in the fastest time. There was also an additional prize of $200,000 offered for full completion of the course, which entailed making it through to stage 4, Mount Midoriyama, and successfully making the rope climb ascent in the allotted time. However, as no competitor successfully completed the third stage of the Grand Final, the 4th stage and full completion of the course remained unattempted, and the bonus prize unawarded this season.
Warped Wall - This season included two warped walls during the heats, the ‘standard’ Warped Wall with a height of 4.25 metres and a one metre taller Mega Warped Wall (5.25 metres). The choice was up to the contestant on which to attempt however competitors were not allowed to switch between walls after failing an attempt, e.g. if they opted for the Mega Warped Wall and failed they were not allowed to switch over to the lower standard Warped Wall. If they chose the Mega Warped Wall and reached the top they won a bonus $5,000.

Rounds

Episode 1

Heat 1 
This episode aired on 8 July 2019. Only 5 competitors completed this course, with a large number of athletes bowing out on the Spinball Wizard. Returning competitor Ashlin Herbert was the only contestant to completely climb the Mega Warped Wall, and received $5,000.

Floating Steps
Swing Surfer
Tuning Forks
Rolling Steel
Spinball Wizard
Warped Wall or Mega Warped Wall

Episode 2

Heat 2 
This episode aired on 9 July 2019. Only 4 competitors completed this course. Returning favourite  Bryson Klein was the only contestant to completely climb the Mega Warped Wall, and received $5,000.

Floating Steps
Butterfly Wall
Tuning Forks
Rolling Steel
Double Squirrel
Warped Wall or Mega Warped Wall

Episode 3

Heat 3 
This episode aired on 14 July 2019.  Only 5 competitors completed this course, with a large number of athletes bowing out on the Spinball Wizard.

Floating Steps
Swing Surfer
Tuning Forks
Rolling Steel
Spinball Wizard
Warped Wall or Mega Warped Wall

Episode 4

Heat 4 
This episode aired on 15 July 2019. 
Only 3 competitors completed this course, (2 of which received $5,000 for completing the Mega Warped Wall) with a large number of athletes bowing out on the Whisked Away.

Floating Steps
Butterfly Wall
Tuning Forks
Rolling Steel
Whisked Away
Warped Wall or Mega Warped Wall

Episode 5

Heat 5 
This episode aired on 16 July 2019.  8 competitors completed this course (5 of which received $5,000 for completing the Mega Warped Wall).

Floating Steps
Butterfly Wall
Tuning Forks
Rolling Steel
Double Squirrel
Warped Wall or Mega Warped Wall

Episode 6

Semi-Final 1 
This episode aired on 21 July 2019.

Archer Steps				
Rolling Log				
Razor's Edge				
Floating Stairs				
Basket Toss				
Warped Wall				
Salmon Ladder				
Flying Shelf				
Bouncing Spider				
Invisible Ladder

Episode 7

Semi-Final 2 
This episode aired on 22 July 2019.

 Archer Steps
 Rolling Log
 Razor's Edge
 Ring Toss
 Bar Hop
 Warped Wall
 Salmon Ladder
 Flying Shelf
 Bouncing Spider
 Invisible Ladder

Episode 8

Semi-Final 3 
This episode aired on 23 July 2019. The Energiser performance of the night went to Bryson Klein.

 Archer Steps
 Rolling Log
 Razor's Edge
 Ring Toss
 Bar Hop
 Warped Wall
 Salmon Ladder
 Flying Shelf
 Bouncing Spider
 Invisible Ladder

Episode 9

Grand Final, Stage 1 
This episode aired on 28 July 2019.

Competitors had to complete Stage 1 within 3 minutes and 15 seconds to advance to Stage 2.

 Archer Steps
 Propeller
 Spinning Log 
 Swinging Cliff Hanger 
 Wing Nuts 
 Warped Wall 
 The Hinge 
 Spider Jump 
 Chimney Sweep

Episode 10 

This episode aired on 29 July 2019.

Grand Final, Stage 2 

Competitors had to complete Stage 2 within 2 minutes and 10 seconds.

 Rope Jungle
 I-Beam Gap
 Salmon Ladder
 Unstable Bridge
 Trapeze to Parallel Pipes
 Cat Grab
 Wall Lift

Five competitors were successful in completing the stage within the allotted time and advanced to stage 3.

Grand Final, Stage 3 

 Cannonball Alley
 Body Prop
 Crazy Cliffhanger
 Floating Doors
 Flying Bars

Rob Patterson failed on the Body Prop.

The other 4 contestants all made it as far as the Floating Doors, where they all fell.

There was no time limit imposed in which to complete Stage 3 and times were not shown on-screen. However, with no competitor completing the stage and with four all failing at the second last obstacle, the winner was decided as the competitor who had reached the furthest obstacle in the fastest time. In a presentation ceremony at the end of the episode it was revealed that that person was Charlie Robbins and he was declared Australian Ninja Warrior for 2019 and awarded the prize for that title.

Obstacles by episode

Heats (episodes 1-5)

Finals (episodes 6-10)

Viewership

References

Australian Ninja Warrior
2019 Australian television seasons